Jeannot Welter (15 March 1928 – 22 December 1998) was a Luxembourgian boxer. He competed at the 1948 Summer Olympics and the 1952 Summer Olympics.

References

External links
 

1928 births
1998 deaths
Luxembourgian male boxers
Olympic boxers of Luxembourg
Boxers at the 1948 Summer Olympics
Boxers at the 1952 Summer Olympics
Sportspeople from Moselle (department)
Middleweight boxers